What constitutes a definition of fascism and fascist governments has been a complicated and highly disputed subject concerning the exact nature of fascism and its core tenets debated amongst historians, political scientists, and other scholars since Benito Mussolini first used the term in 1915. Historian Ian Kershaw once wrote that "trying to define 'fascism' is like trying to nail jelly to the wall".

A significant number of scholars agree that a "fascist regime" is foremost an authoritarian form of government, although not all authoritarian regimes are fascist. Authoritarianism is thus a defining characteristic, but most scholars will say that more distinguishing traits are needed to make an authoritarian regime fascist.

Similarly, fascism as an ideology is also hard to define. Originally, it referred to a totalitarian political movement linked with corporatism which existed in Italy from 1922 to 1943 under the leadership of Benito Mussolini. Many scholars use the word "fascism" without capitalization in a more general sense, to refer to an ideology (or group of ideologies) which was influential in many countries at many different times. For this purpose, they have sought to identify what Roger Griffin calls a "fascist minimum"—that is, the minimum conditions that a certain political movement must meet in order to be considered "fascist".

Scholars have studied the apocalyptic and millenarian aspects of fascism.

By encyclopedias

Encyclopaedia Britannica 

Holocaust Encyclopedia 
The Holocaust Encyclopedia defines fascism as "a far-right political philosophy, or theory of government, that emerged in the early twentieth century. Fascism prioritizes the nation over the individual, who exists to serve the nation." and as "an ultranationalist, authoritarian political philosophy. It combines elements of nationalism, militarism, economic self-sufficiency, and totalitarianism. It opposes communism, socialism, pluralism, individual rights and equality, and democratic government."

By fascists

Benito Mussolini 
Benito Mussolini, who was the first to use the term for his political party in 1915, described fascism in The Doctrine of Fascism, published in 1932, as follows:

In a speech before the Chamber of Deputies on 26 May 1927, Mussolini said:

Francisco Franco 
In an interview with Henri Massis in 1938, Spanish Nationalist leader Francisco Franco described his movement in Spain as part of a wider trend and said about this trend:

By scholars

Umberto Eco 
In his 1995 essay "Ur-Fascism", cultural theorist Umberto Eco lists fourteen general properties of fascist ideology. He argues that it is not possible to organise these into a coherent system, but that "it is enough that one of them be present to allow fascism to coagulate around it". He uses the term "fascism" as a generic description of different historical forms of fascism. The fourteen properties are as follows:
 "The cult of tradition", characterized by cultural syncretism, even at the risk of internal contradiction. When all truth has already been revealed by tradition, no new learning can occur, only further interpretation and refinement.
 "The rejection of modernism", which views the rationalistic development of Western culture since the Enlightenment as a descent into depravity. Eco distinguishes this from a rejection of superficial technological advancement, as many fascist regimes cite their industrial potency as proof of the vitality of their system.
 "The cult of action for action's sake", which dictates that action is of value in itself and should be taken without intellectual reflection. This, says Eco, is connected with anti-intellectualism and irrationalism, and often manifests in attacks on modern culture and science.
 "Disagreement is treason" fascism devalues intellectual discourse and critical reasoning as barriers to action, as well as out of fear that such analysis will expose the contradictions embodied in a syncretistic faith.
 "Fear of difference", which fascism seeks to exploit and exacerbate, often in the form of racism or an appeal against foreigners and immigrants.
 "Appeal to a frustrated middle class", fearing economic pressure from the demands and aspirations of lower social groups.
 "Obsession with a plot" and the hyping-up of an enemy threat. This often combines an appeal to xenophobia with a fear of disloyalty and sabotage from marginalized groups living within the society (such as the German elite's "fear" of the 1930s Jewish populace's businesses and well-doings; see also antisemitism). Eco also cites Pat Robertson's book The New World Order as a prominent example of a plot obsession.
 Fascist societies rhetorically cast their enemies as "at the same time too strong and too weak". On the one hand, fascists play up the power of certain disfavored elites to encourage in their followers a sense of grievance and humiliation. On the other hand, fascist leaders point to the decadence of those elites as proof of their ultimate feebleness in the face of an overwhelming popular will.
 "Pacifism is trafficking with the enemy" because "life is permanent warfare" there must always be an enemy to fight. Both fascist Germany under Hitler and Italy under Mussolini worked first to organize and clean up their respective countries and then build the war machines that they later intended to and did use, despite Germany being under restrictions of the Versailles treaty to not build a military force. This principle leads to a fundamental contradiction within fascism: the incompatibility of ultimate triumph with perpetual war.
 "Contempt for the weak", which is uncomfortably married to a chauvinistic popular elitism, in which every member of society is superior to outsiders by virtue of belonging to the in-group. Eco sees in these attitudes the root of a deep tension in the fundamentally hierarchical structure of fascist polities, as they encourage leaders to despise their underlings, up to the ultimate leader, who holds the whole country in contempt for having allowed him to overtake it by force. 
 "Everybody is educated to become a hero", which leads to the embrace of a cult of death. As Eco observes, "[t]he Ur-Fascist hero is impatient to die. In his impatience, he more frequently sends other people to death."
 "Machismo", which sublimates the difficult work of permanent war and heroism into the sexual sphere. Fascists thus hold "both disdain for women and intolerance and condemnation of nonstandard sexual habits, from chastity to homosexuality".
 "Selective populism" the people, conceived monolithically, have a common will, distinct from and superior to the viewpoint of any individual. As no mass of people can ever be truly unanimous, the leader holds himself out as the interpreter of the popular will (though truly he dictates it). Fascists use this concept to delegitimize democratic institutions they accuse of "no longer represent[ing] the voice of the people".
 "Newspeak" fascism employs and promotes an impoverished vocabulary in order to limit critical reasoning.

Emilio Gentile 
Italian historian of fascism Emilio Gentile described fascism in 1996 as the "sacralization of politics" through totalitarian methods and argued the following ten constituent elements:
 a mass movement with multiclass membership in which prevail, among the leaders and the militants, the middle sectors, in large part new to political activity, organized as a party militia, that bases its identity not on social hierarchy or class origin but on a sense of comradeship, believes itself invested with a mission of national regeneration, considers itself in a state of war against political adversaries and aims at conquering a monopoly of political power by using terror, parliamentary politics, and deals with leading groups, to create a new regime that destroys parliamentary democracy;
 an "anti-ideological" and pragmatic ideology that proclaims itself antimaterialist, anti-individualist, anti-liberal, antidemocratic, anti-Marxist, populist and anticapitalist, and expresses itself aesthetically more than theoretically by means of a new political style and by myths, rites, and symbols as a lay religion designed to acculturate, socialize, and integrate the faith of the masses with the goal of creating a "new man";
 a culture founded on mystical thought and the tragic and activist sense of life conceived of as the manifestation of the will to power, on the myth of youth as artificer of history, and on the exaltation of the militarization of politics as the model of life and collective activity;
 a totalitarian conception of the primacy of politics, conceived of as an integrating experience to carry out the fusion of the individual and the masses in the organic and mystical unity of the nation as an ethnic and moral community, adopting measures of discrimination and persecution against those considered to be outside this community either as enemies of the regime or members of races considered to be inferior or otherwise dangerous for the integrity of the nation;
 a civil ethic founded on total dedication to the national community, on discipline, virility, comradeship, and the warrior spirit;
 a single state party that has the task of providing for the armed defense of the regime, selecting its directing cadres, and organizing the masses within the state in a process of permanent mobilization of emotion and faith;
 a police apparatus that prevents, controls, and represses dissidence and opposition, including through the use of organized terror;
 a political system organized by hierarchy of functions named from the top and crowned by the figure of the "leader", invested with a sacred charisma, who commands, directs, and coordinates the activities of the party and the regime;
 corporative organization of the economy that suppresses trade union liberty, broadens the sphere of state intervention, and seeks to achieve, by principles of technocracy and solidarity, the collaboration of the "productive sectors" under control of the regime, to achieve its goals of power, yet preserving private property and class divisions;
 a foreign policy inspired by the myth of national power and greatness, with the goal of imperialist expansion.

A. James Gregor 
A. James Gregor, co-founder of the International Association for the Advancement of Ethnology and Eugenics, a prominent group in the promotion of eugenics and segregation, affirmed that fascism was a "variant of Sorelian syndicalism" which also included components of neo-idealism and elitist socialism. Gregor stated that Stalinism and Fascist totalitarianism would have been impossible without the "transmogrified Marxism, that infilled both". According to Gregor:
 
Fascism was a variant of classical Marxism, a belief system that pressed some themes argued by both Marx and Engels until they found expression in the form of "national syndicalism" that was to animate the first Fascism.

Furthermore, he believed that post-Maoist China displays many fascist traits. He has denied that fascism is "right-wing extremism".

Gregor's work has come under increasing criticism in the 21st century. In a review of his 2006 essay on Neofascist movements, Peter H. Merkl, of the University of California, Santa Barbara, accuses Gregor of ignoring modern work in favor of his own views, and attempting to force an out of date definition of fascism. Merkl writes:

In comparing the movements of 1919 with those of the last 30 years, for example, he [Gregor] ignores the differences between the issues created by the World War I peace settlement and the struggle against non-white immigration.

Roger Griffin 
Historian and political scientist Roger Griffin's definition of fascism focuses on the populist fascist rhetoric that argues for a "re-birth" of a conflated nation and ethnic people. According to Griffin,
[F]ascism is best defined as a revolutionary form of nationalism, one that sets out to be a political, social and ethical revolution, welding the "people" into a dynamic national community under new elites infused with heroic values. The core myth that inspires this project is that only a populist, trans-class movement of purifying, cathartic national rebirth (palingenesis) can stem the tide of decadence.

Griffin writes that a broad scholarly consensus developed in English-speaking social sciences during the 1990s, around the following definition of fascism:
[Fascism is] a genuinely revolutionary, trans-class form of anti-liberal, and in the last analysis, anti-conservative nationalism. As such it is an ideology deeply bound up with modernization and modernity, one which has assumed a considerable variety of external forms to adapt itself to the particular historical and national context in which it appears, and has drawn a wide range of cultural and intellectual currents, both left and right, anti-modern and pro-modern, to articulate itself as a body of ideas, slogans, and doctrine. In the inter-war period it manifested itself primarily in the form of an elite-led "armed party" which attempted, mostly unsuccessfully, to generate a populist mass movement through a liturgical style of politics and a programme of radical policies which promised to overcome a threat posed by international socialism, to end the degeneration affecting the nation under liberalism, and to bring about a radical renewal of its social, political and cultural life as part of what was widely imagined to be the new era being inaugurated in Western civilization. The core mobilizing myth of fascism which conditions its ideology, propaganda, style of politics and actions is the vision of the nation's imminent rebirth from decadence.

Griffin argues that the above definition can be condensed into one sentence: "Fascism is a political ideology whose mythic core in its various permutations is a palingenetic form of populist ultra-nationalism." The word "palingenetic" in this case refers to notions of national rebirth.

Ian Kershaw 
In his history of Europe in the first half of the 20th century, To Hell and Back, British historian Ian Kershaw, while noting the difficulties in defining fascism, found these common factors in the extreme Right-wing movements of the late 1920s and early 1930s, whether they called themselves "fascist" or not:
 hypernationalism based on the integrated nation cleansed of the influence of ethnic minorities, "foreign" races, and other undesirable elements;
 racial exclusiveness although not necessarily the biological racism of the Nazis a cleansed nation would allow the unique or superior qualities of the people to come forth;
 complete destruction of political enemies through radical and violent means, not only against Marxists, but also democrats, liberals, and reactionaries;
 an emphasis on discipline, manliness and militarism linked to authoritarianism and often involving the use of paramilitary forces.

Other features Kershaw found to be important, and sometimes central to specific movements, but not present in all:
 the creation of a "new man" and a new society requiring the total commitment of the population to the overturning of the existing social order and the building of a national utopia, in "a revolution of mentalities, values and will".
 irredentist or imperialist goals not necessarily all expansionist in nature;
 anti-capitalism;
 corporatism the reorganization of the national economy along corporatist lines, with trade unions eliminated and groupings of economic interests called "corporations" (i.e. industrial and agricultural workers, teachers and students, lawyers and doctors, civil servants, etc.) regulated by the state.
Kershaw argues that the difference between fascism and other forms of right-wing authoritarianism in the Interwar period is that the latter generally aimed "to conserve the existing social order", whereas fascism was "revolutionary", seeking to change society and obtain "total commitment" from the population.

Kershaw writes about the essential appeal of fascism and the reasons for its success, where it was successful (primarily in Italy and Germany):
Fascism's message of national renewal, powerfully linking fear and hope, was diverse enough to be capable of crossing social boundaries. Its message enveloped an appeal to the material vested interests of quite disparate social groups in a miasma of emotive rhetoric about the future of the nation. It touched the interests of those who felt threatened by the forces of modernizing social change. It mobilized those who believed they had something to lose status, property, power, cultural tradition through the presumed menace of internal enemies, and especially through the advance of socialism and its revolutionary promise of social revolution. However, it bound up those interests in a vision of a new society that would reward the strong, the fit, the meritorious the deserving (in their own eyes).

... Fascism's triumph depended on the complete discrediting of state authority, weak political elite who could no longer ensure that a system would operate in their interests, the fragmentation of party politics, and the freedom to build a movement that promised a radical alternative.

George Lakoff and Mark Johnson 
In their book Philosophy in the Flesh: The Embodied Mind and its Challenge to Western Thought, philosophers George Lakoff and Mark Johnson wrote about fascism, in the chapter about morality:

John Lukacs 
John Lukacs, Hungarian-American historian and Holocaust survivor, argues in The Hitler of History that there is no such thing as generic fascism, claiming that National Socialism and Italian Fascism were more different than similar and that, alongside communism, they were ultimately radical forms of populism.

Ludwig von Mises 
Classical liberal economist and philosopher Ludwig von Mises, in his 1927 book Liberalism, argued that fascism was a nationalist and militarist reaction against the rise of the communist Third International, in which the nationalists and militarists came to oppose the principles of liberal democracy because "Liberalism, they thought, stayed their hand when they desired to strike a blow against the revolutionary parties while it was still possible to do so. If liberalism had not hindered them, they would, so they believe, have bloodily nipped the revolutionary movements in the bud. Revolutionary ideas had been able to take root and flourish only because of the tolerance they had been accorded by their opponents, whose will power had been enfeebled by a regard for liberal principles that, as events subsequently proved, was overscrupulous." He continues by defining fascism as follows:
The fundamental idea of these movements—which, from the name of the most grandiose and tightly disciplined among them, the Italian, may, in general, be designated as Fascist—consists in the proposal to make use of the same unscrupulous methods in the struggle against the Third International as the latter employs against its opponents. The Third International seeks to exterminate its adversaries and their ideas in the same way that the hygienist strives to exterminate a pestilential bacillus; it considers itself in no way bound by the terms of any compact that it may conclude with opponents, and it deems any crime, any lie, and any calumny permissible in carrying on its struggle. The Fascists, at least in principle, profess the same intentions.

Ernst Nolte 
Ernst Nolte, a German historian and Hegelian philosopher, defined fascism in 1965 as a reaction against other political movements, especially Marxism: "Fascism is anti-Marxism which seeks to destroy the enemy by the evolvement of a radically opposed and yet related ideology and by the use of almost identical and yet typically modified methods, always, however, within the unyielding framework of national self-assertion and autonomy." Nolte also argued that fascism functioned at three levels: in the world of politics as a form of opposition to Marxism, at the sociological level in opposition to bourgeois values, and in the "metapolitical" world as "resistance to transcendence" ("transcendence" in German can be translated as the "spirit of modernity").

Kevin Passmore 
Kevin Passmore, a history lecturer at Cardiff University, defines fascism in his 2002 book Fascism: A Very Short Introduction. His definition is directly descended from the view put forth by Ernesto Laclau, and is also informed by a desire to adjust for what he believes are shortcomings in Marxist, Weberian and other analyses of fascism:
Fascism is a set of ideologies and practices that seeks to place the nation, defined in exclusive biological, cultural, and/or historical terms, above all other sources of loyalty, and to create a mobilized national community. Fascist nationalism is reactionary in that it entails implacable hostility to socialism and feminism, for they are seen as prioritizing class or gender rather than nation. This is why fascism is a movement of the extreme right. Fascism is also a movement of the radical right because the defeat of socialism and feminism and the creation of the mobilized nation are held to depend upon the advent to power of a new elite acting in the name of the people, headed by a charismatic leader, and embodied in a mass, militarized party. Fascists are pushed towards conservatism by common hatred of socialism and feminism, but are prepared to override conservative interests – family, property, religion, the universities, the civil service – where the interests of the nation are considered to require it. Fascist radicalism also derives from a desire to assuage discontent by accepting specific demands of the labour and women's movements, so long as these demands accord with the national priority. Fascists seek to ensure the harmonization of workers' and women's interests with those of the nation by mobilizing them within special sections of the party and/or within a corporate system. Access to these organizations and to the benefits they confer upon members depends on the individual's national, political, and/or racial characteristics. All aspects of fascist policy are suffused with ultranationalism.

Robert Paxton 
Robert Paxton, a professor emeritus at Columbia University, defines fascism in his 2004 book The Anatomy of Fascism as:
A form of political behavior marked by obsessive preoccupation with community decline, humiliation or victimhood and by compensatory cults of unity, energy and purity, in which a mass-based party of committed nationalist militants, working in uneasy but effective collaboration with traditional elites, abandons democratic liberties and pursues with redemptive violence and without ethical or legal restraints goals of internal cleansing and external expansion.

In the same book, Paxton also argues that fascism's foundations lie in a set of "mobilizing passions" rather than an elaborated doctrine. He argues these passions can explain much of the behaviour of fascists:
 a sense of overwhelming crisis beyond the reach of any traditional solutions;
 the primacy of the group, toward which one has duties superior to every right, whether individual or universal, and the subordination of the individual to it;
 the belief that one’s group is a victim, a sentiment that justifies any action, without legal or moral limits, against its enemies, both internal and external;
 dread of the group’s decline under the corrosive effects of individualistic liberalism, class conflict, and alien influences;
 the need for closer integration of a purer community, by consent if possible, or by exclusionary violence if necessary;
 the need for authority by natural chiefs (always male), culminating in a national chieftain who alone is capable of incarnating the group’s historical destiny;
 the superiority of the leader’s instincts over abstract and universal reason;
 the beauty of violence and the efficacy of will, when they are devoted to the group’s success;
 the right of the chosen people to dominate others without restraint from any kind of human or divine law, right being decided by the sole criterion of the group’s prowess within a Darwinian struggle.

Stanley G. Payne 
Historian of fascism Stanley G. Payne created a lengthy list of characteristics to identify fascism in 1995: in summary form, there are three main strands. First, Payne's "fascist negations" refers to such typical policies as anti-communism and anti-liberalism. Second, "fascist goals" include a nationalist dictatorship and an expanded empire. Third, "fascist style", is seen in its emphasis on violence and authoritarianism, and its exultation of men above women, and young above old.

 A. Ideology and Goals:
 Espousal of an idealist, vitalist, and voluntaristic philosophy, normally involving the attempt to realize a new modern, self-determined, and secular culture
 Creation of a new nationalist authoritarian state not based on traditional principles or models
 Organization of a new highly regulated, multiclass, integrated national economic structure, whether called national corporatist, national socialist, or national syndicalist
 Positive evaluation and use of, or willingness to use, violence and war
 The goal of empire, expansion, or a radical change in the nation's relationship with other powers
 B. The Fascist Negations:
 Antiliberalism
 Anticommunism
 Anticonservatism (though with the understanding that fascist groups were willing to undertake temporary alliances with other sectors, more commonly with the right)
 C. Style and Organization:
 Attempted mass mobilization with militarization of political relationships and style and with the goal of a mass single party militia
 Emphasis on aesthetic structure of meetings, symbols, and political liturgy, stressing emotional and mystical aspects
 Extreme stress on the masculine principle and male dominance, while espousing a strongly organic view of society
 Exaltation of youth above other phases of life, emphasizing the conflict of the generations, at least in effecting the initial political transformation
 Specific tendency toward an authoritarian, charismatic, personal style of command, whether or not the command is to some degree initially elective

Jason Stanley 
In 2020, National Public Radio interviewed Jason Stanley, a professor of philosophy at Yale University, regarding his book How Fascism Works: The Politics of Us and Them. Stanley defined fascism as "a cult of the leader who promises national restoration in the face of humiliation brought on by supposed communists, Marxists and minorities and immigrants who are supposedly posing a threat to the character and the history of a nation" and further observed that "The leader proposes that only he can solve it and all of his political opponents are enemies or traitors."

Zeev Sternhell 
Zeev Sternhell, a historian and professor of political science, described Fascism as a reaction against modernity and a backlash against the changes it had caused to society, as a "rejection of the prevailing systems: liberalism and Marxism, positivism and democracy". At the same time, Sternhell argued that part of what made Fascism unique was that it wanted to retain the benefits of progress and modernism while rejecting the values and social changes that had come with it; Fascism embraced liberal market-based economics and the violent revolutionary rhetoric of Marxism, but rejected their philosophical principles.

By Marxists 
Marxists argue that fascism represents the last attempt of a ruling class (specifically, the capitalist bourgeoisie) to preserve its grip on power in the face of an imminent proletarian revolution. Marxists believe fascist movements are not necessarily created by the ruling class, but they can only gain political power with the help of that class and with funding from big business. Once in power, the fascists serve the interests of their benefactors.

György Lukács 
Hungarian philosopher György Lukács in his works The Destruction of Reason (Die Zerstörung der Vernunft, 1952) and Zur Kritik der faschistischen Ideologie (1989) considers the ideology of fascism as the "demagogic synthesis" of all the irrationalist trends of the 19th and early 20th centuries, such as the reaction against the ideas of the Enlightenment and the French Revolution, the Romantic critique of capitalism (Carlyle) which after 1848 turned into "indirect apologetics" of capitalism (Nietzsche), anti-democratic or "aristocratic epistemology" (Lukács' term for philosophies that considered knowledge to be the privilege of an elite, first expressed in Schelling's concept of intellectual intuition and culminating in the metaphysical views of Henri Bergson), emphasis on myth and mysticism, the rejection of humanism, a cult of personality around the leader, the subjugation of reason to instinct, the conception of the nation and people in clearly biological terms, the glorification of war, etc.. According to Lukács, the historical significance of Hitler and Mussolini lies not in that they brought anything new to the ideological field, but in that they condensed all existing reactionary and irrationalist ideologies of the past and through their successful national and social demagogy brought them "from the scholar's study and intellectual coteries to the streets."

Bertolt Brecht 
German playwright Bertolt Brecht describes fascism as: "a historic phase of capitalism" and "...the nakedest, most shameless, most oppressive, and most treacherous form of capitalism" (1935).

Georgi Dimitrov 
Georgi Dimitrov, a Bulgarian Communist, was a theorist of capitalism who expanded Lenin's ideas and the work of Clara Zetkin.

Delivering an official report to the 7th World Congress of the Communist Third International in August 1935, Georgi Dimitrov cited the definition of fascism formulated with the help of Clara Zetkin at the Third Plenum as "the open, terrorist dictatorship of the most reactionary, most chauvinistic, and most imperialist elements of finance capital".

According to Dimitrov:
"Fascism is not a form of state power "standing above both classes – the proletariat and the bourgeoisie," as Otto Bauer, for instance, has asserted. It is not "the revolt of the petty bourgeoisie which has captured the machinery of the state," as the British Socialist Brailsford declares. No, fascism is not a power standing above class, nor government of the petty bourgeoisie or the lumpen-proletariat over finance capital. Fascism is the power of finance capital itself. It is the organization of terrorist vengeance against the working class and the revolutionary section of the peasantry and intelligentsia. In foreign policy, fascism is jingoism in its most brutal form, fomenting bestial hatred of other nations.... The development of fascism, and the fascist dictatorship itself, assume different forms in different countries, according to historical, social and economic conditions and to the national peculiarities, and the international position of the given country."

Leon Trotsky 
One of Russian Marxist revolutionary Leon Trotsky’s earliest attempts at trying to define fascism was in November 1931 when he wrote a letter to a friend titled "What is Fascism". In it, Trotsky wrote, in what is as much description as analysis: 

The Fascist movement in Italy was a spontaneous movement of large masses, with new leaders from the rank and file. It is a plebeian movement in origin, directed and financed by big capitalist powers. It issued forth from the petty bourgeoisie, the slum proletariat and even to a certain extent, from the proletarian masses, Mussolini, a former socialist, is a “self-made” man arising from this movement.The movement in Germany is analogous mostly to the Italian movement. It is a mass movement, with its leaders employing a great deal of socialist demagogy. This is necessary for the creation of the mass movement.The genuine basis is the petty bourgeoisie. In Italy it is a very large base – the petty bourgeoisie of the towns and cities, and the peasantry. In Germany likewise, there is a large base for Fascism. In England there is less of that base because the proletariat is the overwhelming majority of the population: the peasant or farming stratum only an insignificant section.It may be said, and this is true to a certain extent, that the new middle class, the functionaries of the state, the private administrators, etc., etc., can constitute such a base. But this is a new question that must be analyzed. This is a supposition. It is necessary to analyze just what it will be. It is necessary to foresee the Fascist movement growing from this or that element. But this is only a perspective which is controlled by events. I am not affirming that it is impossible for a Fascist movement to develop in England or for a Mosley or someone else to become a dictator. This is a question for the future. It is a far-fetched possibility.To speak of it now as an imminent danger is not a prognosis but a mere prophecy. In order to be capable of foreseeing anything in the direction of Fascism, it is necessary to have a definition of that idea. What is Fascism? What is its base, its form and its characteristics? How will its development take place?

In Trotsky’s posthumously published 1944 tract, Fascism: What It Is and How to Fight It, he noted: "The historic function of fascism is to smash the working class, destroy its organizations, and stifle political liberties when the capitalists find themselves unable to govern and dominate with the help of democratic machinery."

Amadeo Bordiga 
Amadeo Bordiga argued that fascism is merely another form of bourgeois rule, on the same level as bourgeois democracy or traditional monarchy, and that it is not particularly reactionary or otherwise exceptional.

Clara Zetkin 
An early study of fascism was written by Clara Zetkin for the Third Enlarged Plenum of the Executive Committee of the Communist International in 1923: 

Fascism is the concentrated expression of the general offensive undertaken by the world bourgeoisie against the proletariat.... fascism [is] an expression of the decay and disintegration of the capitalist economy and as a symptom of the bourgeois state’s dissolution. We can combat fascism only if we grasp that it rouses and sweeps along broad social masses who have lost the earlier security of their existence and with it, often, their belief in social order.... It will be much easier for us to defeat Fascism if we clearly and distinctly study its nature. Hitherto there have been extremely vague ideas upon this subject not only among the large masses of the workers, but even among the revolutionary vanguard of the proletariat and the Communists.... The Fascist leaders are not a small and exclusive caste; they extend deeply into wide elements of the population.

By others

Laurence W. Britt 
In the Spring 2003 issue of the secular humanist magazine Free Inquiry, Laurence W. Britt, who is described as "a retired international businessperson, writer, and commentator" published "Fascism Anyone?", which included a list of 14 defining characteristics of fascism. The list has since been widely circulated in both modified and unmodified forms. In a newspaper interview in 2004, Britt expanded and clarified the meaning of some of the points in his list, and discussed how they applied to the United States at that time.

The headers for Britt's original list, without his sometimes extensive explanations, are:

"Powerful and continuing expressions of nationalism"
"Disdain for the importance of human rights"
"Identification of enemies/scapegoats as a unifying cause"
"The supremacy of the military/avid militarism"
"Rampant sexism"
"A controlled mass media"
"Obsession with national security"
"Religion and ruling elite tied together"
"Power of corporations protected"
"Power of labor suppressed or eliminated"
"Disdain and suppression of intellectuals and the arts"
"Obsession with crime and punishment"
"Rampant cronyism and corruption"
"Fraudulent elections"

George Orwell 
Anti-fascist author George Orwell describes fascism in economic terms in a 1941 essay, "Shopkeepers At War":

Fascism, at any rate the German version, is a form of capitalism that borrows from Socialism just such features as will make it efficient for war purposes... It is a planned system geared to a definite purpose, world-conquest, and not allowing any private interest, either of capitalist or worker, to stand in its way.

Writing for Tribune magazine in 1944, Orwell stated:
...It is not easy, for instance, to fit Germany and Japan into the same framework, and it is even harder with some of the small states which are describable as Fascist. It is usually assumed, for instance, that Fascism is inherently warlike, that it thrives in an atmosphere of war hysteria and can only solve its economic problems by means of war preparation or foreign conquests. But clearly this is not true of, say, Portugal or the various South American dictatorships. Or again, antisemitism is supposed to be one of the distinguishing marks of Fascism; but some Fascist movements are not antisemitic. Learned controversies, reverberating for years on end in American magazines, have not even been able to determine whether or not Fascism is a form of capitalism. But still, when we apply the term ‘Fascism’ to Germany or Japan or Mussolini's Italy, we know broadly what we mean.

Franklin D. Roosevelt 
American President Franklin D. Roosevelt, who led the US into war with the fascist Axis powers, wrote about fascism:

"Fascist" as insult 

Some have argued that the terms fascism and fascist have become hopelessly vague since the World War II period, and that today it is little more than a pejorative used by supporters of various political views to insult their opponents. The word fascist is sometimes used to denigrate people, institutions, or groups that would not describe themselves as ideologically fascist, and that may not fall within the formal definition of the word. As a political epithet, fascist has been used in an anti-authoritarian sense to emphasize the common ideology of governmental suppression of individual freedom. In this sense, the word fascist is intended to mean oppressive, intolerant, chauvinist, genocidal, dictatorial, racist, or aggressive. George Orwell wrote in 1944:
...the word 'Fascism' is almost entirely meaningless. In conversation, of course, it is used even more wildly than in print. I have heard it applied to farmers, shopkeepers, Social Credit, corporal punishment, fox-hunting, bull-fighting, the 1922 Committee, the 1941 Committee, Kipling, Gandhi, Chiang Kai-Shek, homosexuality, Priestley's broadcasts, Youth Hostels, astrology, women, dogs and I do not know what else ... Except for the relatively small number of Fascist sympathisers, almost any English person would accept 'bully' as a synonym for 'Fascist'. That is about as near to a definition as this much-abused word has come.

See also 
 Fascism and ideology
 Palingenetic ultranationalism

References 
Notes

Bibliography

 
 
 
 
 
 
 
 
 
 
 
 
 
 
 
 
 
 
 
 
 
  Contains chapters on fascist movements in different countries.

External links 
 The Origins of Fascism: Islamic Fascism, Islamophobia, Antisemitism Walter Laqueur, 25 October 2006
 Authorized translation of Mussolini’s "The Political and Social Doctrine of Fascism" (1933)

Fascism

Political terminology
Fascism